USS Scurry (AM-304) was a steel-hulled  constructed for the U.S. Navy during World War II. She was crewed by sailors who were trained in minesweeping, and quickly sent to the Pacific Ocean to clear minefields so that Allied forces could invade Japanese-held  beaches. For this dangerous work, often under enemy fire, she was awarded four battle stars.

She was laid down on 24 May 1943 by Associated Shipbuilders, Seattle and launched on 1 October 1943; sponsored by Miss Winette DeLaye. The minesweeper was commissioned on 29 July 1944. The spelling of her name was changed from Skurry to Scurry on 3 August 1944.

World War II Pacific Theatre operations
Following shakedown between 15 August and 19 September 1944, Scurry departed the west coast on 1 October escorting a convoy to Eniwetok. After arriving there on 3 November, Scurry escorted convoys in the vicinity of Eniwetok and Manus until returning to Pearl Harbor on 13 December. Between 31 December 1944 and 18 January 1945, the ship underwent two six-day periods of minesweeping training off Maui.

Supporting the Invasions of Iwo Jima and Okinawa 
She sailed on 22 January to support the landings at Iwo Jima. Arriving there three days before the assault she swept the assault and transport areas in preparation for the larger ships. Departing Iwo Jima on 3 March, the ship arrived off Okinawa on 25 March and carried out a week of preparatory sweeps before the landings there. She remained off Okinawa until 8 July, sweeping mines and maintaining antisubmarine patrols around the transports. The minesweeper underwent overhaul at Leyte, Philippines, from 13 July to 17 August and, after escorting a convoy to Okinawa, sailed from there on 30 August to clear minefields off Japan.

End-of-War Pacific Theater operations
Scurry swept mines in the Yellow Sea between 1 and 7 September, and then helped to sweep the approaches to Sasebo and Nagasaki, Japan. She was one of the last American ships to enter these ports after the war. Between 17 and 26 September, she acted as pilot vessel at Nagasaki for transports repatriating Allied prisoners of war. She then returned to mine clearance operations, sweeping in the Korea Strait until sailing from Sasebo for the United States on 10 December.

Post-war decommissioning 
The minesweeper arrived at Orange, Texas, on 24 April 1946, and was decommissioned and placed in reserve there on 29 June 1946.

Scurry was reclassified MSF-304 on 7 February 1955. She was struck from the Naval Vessel Register on 1 May 1967 and converted into a salvage training hulk for use by the U.S. Navy at Norfolk, Virginia. Used as a test target Scurry was sunk off the Virginia Capes on 14 August 1967.

Awards 
Scurry received 4 battle stars for her World War II service.

References

External links
 NavSource Online: Mine Warfare Vessel Photo Archive - Scurry (MSF 304) - ex-Scurry (AM 304) - ex-Skurry (AM 304)

Admirable-class minesweepers
Ships built in Seattle
1943 ships
World War II minesweepers of the United States
Ships sunk as targets
Maritime incidents in 1967
Shipwrecks of the Virginia coast